Sodwana Bay is a bay in South Africa on the KwaZulu Natal north coast, between St. Lucia and Lake Sibhayi. It is in the Sodwana Bay National Park, and the Maputaland Marine Reserve, and is a popular recreational diving destination. The term is commonly used to refer to both the marine reserve and the terrestrial park, as well as the geographical bay.

Sodwana Bay National Park is a narrow strip of forested sand dunes located along the east coast. Proclaimed a national park in the 1950s, it is frequented by anglers and divers. Sodwana is situated in the Maputaland Marine Protected Area and is the only recreational scuba diving area along the Greater St Lucia Wetlands Park (now renamed to iSimangaliso) coastline. Classified as one of the top dive sites in the world, the park is visited by some 35 000 scuba divers per year.  The bay is near the southern end of the tropical western Indo-Pacific marine ecoregion, and reef-building corals are present. The  reef complex is the habitat of a wide diversity of resident and migratory species. Several submarine canyons cut into the edge of the continental shelf, which is very close to the shoreline. It was in one of these that on 27 November 2000 that a resident population of coelacanths was discovered.

Sailfish, king mackerel, kingfish and other pelagic species of game fish migrate south down the east coast of Africa and since the activities of sea pirates off the coast of north east Africa healthy populations of pelagic game fish again reach all the way south off the coast of South Africa which has re-established Sodwana as a sport fishing destination for pelagic species. The marine protected area is known for endangered marine megafauna including whale sharks, great white sharks, zambezi sharks, hammerhead sharks, blacktip sharks, manta rays, orange-spotted groupers, potato cod, critically endangered leatherback turtles, loggerhead sea turtles, and coelacanths. The discovery of Coelacanths made the region world-famous. In the March 2011 issue of National Geographic, a short article titled Ancient Swimmers appeared, discussing the discovery of  coelacanths in the depths of Sodwana Bay and the surrounding area. A small section of the written article explains that:

Whale watching targeting migratory or resident cetaceans is a local tourist industry. Bottlenose dolphins live in the vicinity and have been observed to swim with whale sharks. Humpback whales migrate through the bay during winter to spring seasons while southern right whales and other species are less common. Orcas may also visit the bay waters.

The land areas of the iSimangaliso Wetland Park are home to species of large land animals such as lions, giraffes, elephants, hippos and rhinos

Climate

Ecology

Terrestrial

Marine

The inshore waters of Sodwana Bay  are in the Delagoa coastal marine ecoregion.

Economy
The local economy is based on tourism.

Tourism
Tourism in this area is based on recreational scuba diving, gamefishing and game park tours.

Recreational diving

A permit is required to scuba dive in any MPA in South Africa, including the recreational dive sites of the iSimangaliso Marine Protected Area. These permits are valid for a year and are available at some branches of the Post Office. Temporary permits, valid for a month, may be available at dive shops or from dive boat operators who operate in an MPA. A personal recreational scuba diving permit is valid in all South African MPAs where recreational diving is allowed. The business permit to operate recreational scuba business operations in an MPA is restricted to a specific MPA. Diving for commercial or scientific purposes is also subject to permit.

Several snorkelling spots, and a large number of scuba diving sites are available for recreational diving. Several dive operators are based in Sodwana, and equipment and gas fill are available. Diving conditions are generally good throughout the year, but the best visibility of up to 30 metres is most likely during April to September. In suitable weather night dives can be arranged.

Dive sites are concentrated at the following areas:
Two-mile Reef is the most popular area with depths ranging from 9 metres to over 30 metres at the outer edge.
Quarter Mile Reef is most often dived in January and February when Ragged-toothed sharks congregate. 
Stringer Reef at a depth of 14 metres is a small reef with great diversity of species.
They are a bit deeper, and have branching, table and plate corals
There are overhangs, drop-offs and mushroom reefs.
Nine Mile Reef is the northern-most reef of the commonly accessible areas. Depths range from 6 to 21 metres. There is a green tree coral at the drop-off on the seaward side of the reef.
Coelacanth dives at the canyon require a special permit and certification and competence in trimix diving to depths of over 100 m.

References

External links

 St Lucia 3974 South Africa Website
 Sodwana Bay
 Diving and Accommodation in Sodwana Bay
 Coastal Skippers Training

Bays of South Africa
Landforms of KwaZulu-Natal